Gyrinichthys minytremus is a species of snailfish from the northeastern Pacific Ocean  where a single specimen was found once at a depth of  near Unalaska island.  It is also the only member of its genus.

References

Liparidae

Fish described in 1896